HMS Riou (K557) was a British Captain-class frigate of the Royal Navy in commission during World War II. Originally constructed as a United States Navy Buckley class destroyer escort, she served in the Royal Navy from 1943 to 1945.

Construction and transfer
The ship was laid down as the unnamed U.S. Navy destroyer escort DE-92 by Bethlehem-Hingham Shipyard, Inc., in Hingham, Massachusetts, on 4 August 1943 and launched on 23 October 1943. She was transferred to the United Kingdom upon completion on 14 December 1943.

Service history

Commissioned into service in the Royal Navy as the frigate HMS Riou (K557) on 14 December 1943 simultaneously with her transfer, the ship served on patrol and escort duty for the remainder of World War II.

The Royal Navy returned Riou to the U.S. Navy on 25 February 1946.

Disposal
The U.S. Navy struck Riou from its Naval Vessel Register on 28 March 1946. She was sold on 21 April 1947 for scrapping.

References
Sources
Navsource Online: Destroyer Escort Photo Archive Riou (DE-92) HMS Riou (K-557)
uboat.net HMS Riou (K 557)
Destroyer Escort Sailors Association DEs for UK
Captain Class Frigate Association HMS Riou K557 (DE 92)
Citations

External links
Photo gallery of HMS Riou (K557)

 

Captain-class frigates
Buckley-class destroyer escorts
World War II frigates of the United Kingdom
Ships built in Hingham, Massachusetts
1943 ships